Parwar, also spelt as Paravāra (परवार in Hindi, पौरपट्ट in Sanskrit inscriptions), is a major Jain community from the Bundelkhand region, which is largely in Madhya Pradesh, but also includes the two districts of Lalitpur and Jhansi in Uttar Pradesh. Apart from them, Nagpur district (Maharashtra) have also a very large Parwar community. There is an area in Itwari of Nagpur known as Parwar-Pura having large number of Parwar's homes and shops . Most of the Nagpur's Parwar are migrated from Sagar, Deori, and other small villages of Sagar District of MP.  Parwar exclusively follow the Digambar Jain tradition. Parwar usually preferred their marriage within community. There are 12 Gotra in Parwar community. Each Gotra has 12 Moor (lineages). A marriage within the same gotra or lineage are not allowed. Traditionally a marriage within any of the 8 branches (the moor of boy or girl, mother's family, father's mother's family etc) was not permitted and hence the community was termed ashta-shakha.

A number of Jain scholars have belonged to this community, including Tarana Swami, the founder of Taran Panth and the Bhattarakas of Chanderi. Osho was born in the Samaiya section of this community. Also, Pandit Sumerchand Diwakar, Pandit Nathuram Premi, Dr Hiralal Jain, Dr Mahendrakumar Nyayacarya, Pandit Phulacandra Shastri, Pandit Hiralal Jain, Pandit Balacandra Shastri, Pandit Jaganmohanlal Shastri, Pandit Devakinandan Nayak, Swami Satyabhakta, Wardha, philosopher, founder of Satya Samaj (1899–1998) many other illustrious scholars of Jainism were born in the Parwar (also spelt as Paravara) community. The map of districts having large number of Parwar Jains in Madhya Pradesh and Uttar Pradesh is shown below.

History
A number of inscriptions mentiong the community have been found in the region adjacent to the Betwa river, which flows on the border of MP and UP. In the older inscriptions they are called Paurapatta or Puravada. The oldest inscriptions include those found at Vidisha (948 CE), Pachrai (1065 CE), Aharji (1152, 1153), Chanderi (VS 1252,13450), Sironj (VS 1299, 1316), Narwar (VS 1319). A long inscription at Deogarh of VS 1493 mentions Lakshaman Singhai and his large family, who installed an idol of Lord Shantinath under the supervision of Bhattaraka Devendrakirti of Balatkara Gana. It is probably the first mention of the Singhai (or Sanghapati) title in the region.

Some authors have proposed a historic connection between the Parwar and the Porwad communities.

Jainism had a continuous presence in this region since antiquity. Jainism was flourishing during the Gupta period at Vidisha region. The Durjanpur idols installed during the rule of Ramagupta date to about 365 AD. The Udaigiri cave Parshvanath inscription mentioning the lineage of Bhadranvaya is dated to 425 AD. The great Shantinath temple at Deogarh was built before 862 CE, suggesting a prosperous Jain community in this region.

According to Mahavamsa, Devi, the wife of Maurya ruler Ashoka was a daughter of a merchant of Vidisha, whose son Mahinda took Buddhism to Sri Lanka. It is likely that the Parwar community is a continuation of the ancient merchant community of the region.

Organization

The Parwars are divided into 12 gotras, each gotra is further divided into 12 shakhas (mura)s. Traditionally 4 of the shakhas of the grandparents of the boy, and four of the shakhas of the grandparents of the girl were required to be distinct for a marriage to take place. Thus the Parwars were sometimes termed ashta-shaha.

There were once several social divisions among the Parwars, which are no longer significant.

Some Parwars follow Taran Panth and are called Samaiya, because Taran Swami based his teachings on Samayasara of Acharya Kundakunda.

Parwar Sabha was founded in 1917 at Ramtek, after the Bundelkhandiya Jain Sabha broke into community groups. In the 1924 convention, it was proposed that only four shakhas be considered for marriage, but the proposal was defeated. A newsletter Parwar Bandhu was published during 1929–1944.

A "Parwar Directory" was published in 1924 which included population data, according to which the Parwar population then was 48,074. The community resided in 1438 towns and villages with largest population in Sagar, Jhansi, Jabalpur, Damoh and Tikamgarh districts. The largest number are in Lalitpur (1122 in 1924), Mungawali (481), Khaniadhana (320), Pachhar (Ashoknagar Isagarh), Mandawara (304), Sivni (358), Sagar (595), Bamora (374), Khurai (503), Bina-Itawa (358), Pindarai (Mandla 314), Jabalpur (1058) and Tikamgarh. This puts the majority of the major centers within a 50-mile radius from Deogarh (see
,
Map) along the Betwa river in early 20th century.

The main concentration of the Parwars is still in these towns; however, many of them have moved to major industrial cities further away such as Delhi, Mumbai and Bangalore. A few Parwar families now migrated to America.

Distinguished Paravāra Jains

 Bhattaraka Devendrakirti, founder of Chanderi and Gandhar/Rander seat.
 Pandit Nathuram Premi, Historian, publisher and editor (26 November 1881 – 30 January 1960)
 Osho Rajneesh (1931–1990), Indian godman, mystic and founder of the Rajneesh movement
 Pandit Balachandra Shastri, Traditional Jain Scholar, best remembered for his work on the Satkhandāgama and the Kasāyapāhuda
 Swami Satyabhakta, Wardha, philosopher, founder of Satya Samaj (1899–1998)
 Singhai Lakshmana, who installed Lord Shantinatha at Deogarh in 1436.

See also

 Chanderi
 Balatkara Gana
 Jainism in Bundelkhand
 Golalare
 Golapurva
 Gahoi

References

Social groups of Madhya Pradesh
Jain communities
Social groups of Uttar Pradesh
Bundelkhand
Jainism in Uttar Pradesh